John Stephenson (1 June 1899–1979) was an English footballer who played in the Football League for Durham City, Hartlepools United and Norwich City.

References

1899 births
1996 deaths
English footballers
Association football forwards
English Football League players
Craghead United F.C. players
Durham City A.F.C. players
Norwich City F.C. players
Hartlepool United F.C. players
Cork F.C. players
West Stanley F.C. players